Midway is an unincorporated community in Cumberland County, Tennessee, United States.

References

Unincorporated communities in Cumberland County, Tennessee
Unincorporated communities in Tennessee